Samatau is a village on the island of Upolu in Samoa. It is situated on the west side of the island in the political district of A'ana.

The population is 979.

References

Populated places in A'ana